Hypsopygia nigrivitta is a species of snout moth in the genus Hypsopygia. It was described by Francis Walker in 1863. It is found in Australia and south-east Asia, including Borneo, Sulawesi, Java and Malaysia.

The larvae are considered a nuisance since they have the habit of spinning a silken burrow beneath and between two pieces of thatch to which it retreats when not feeding. Usually each thatch strip is occupied by a single larva. As the infested thatch deteriorates with much damage from feeding, a new piece of thatch has to be inserted from time to time.

References

Moths described in 1863
Pyralini